Ian Newton  (born  17 January 1940) is an English ornithologist.

Education and early life
Newton was born and raised in north Derbyshire and was educated at Chesterfield Grammar School. He graduated from the University of Bristol. He received his D.Phil. in 1964 and D.Sc. in 1982  from the University of Oxford, and has studied a wide range of bird species.

Career and research
He has been interested in birds since his childhood. As a teenager he became particularly fascinated by finches and undertook doctoral and post-doctoral studies on them. Newton conducted a 27-year study of a Eurasian sparrowhawk population nesting in southern Scotland, which resulted in what many consider to be the most detailed and longest-running study of any population of birds of prey.

Before retirement, he was Senior Ornithologist at the United Kingdom's Natural Environment Research Council. He has also been head of the Avian Biology Section at the Monks Wood Research Station (1989–2000), Chairman of the Board of The Peregrine Fund, Chairman of the Council of the Royal Society for the Protection of Birds and visiting professor of ornithology at the University of Oxford. Newton has also held the positions of President of the British Ornithologists' Union and the British Ecological Society (1994–1995).

Partial bibliography
Finches (Collins New Naturalist Library) (1972)
Population Ecology of Raptors (1979) T & A.D. Poyser. 
The Sparrowhawk (1986) T & A.D. Poyser. 
Population Limitation in Birds (1998)
The Speciation and Biogeography of Birds (2003)
The Ecology of Bird Migration (2007)
Bird Migration (Collins New Naturalist Library) (2010)  (HB),  (PB)
Bird Populations (Collins New Naturalist Library) (2013) 
Farming and Birds (Collins New Naturalist Library) (2017) 
Uplands and Birds (Collins New Naturalist Library) (2020)

Honours and awards
 Union Medal of the British Ornithological Union (1988)
 Gold Medal of the Royal Society for the Protection of Birds (1991)
 Elected a Fellow of the Royal Society (FRS) in 1993
 Fellow of the Royal Society of Edinburgh (1994) 
 Elliot Cowes Award of the American Ornithologists' Union (1995)
 Order of the British Empire (1999)
 President's Medal of the British Ecological Society

References

1940 births
Living people
Fellows of the Royal Society
Fellows of the Royal Society of Edinburgh
English biologists
English ornithologists
British science writers
New Naturalist writers
Officers of the Order of the British Empire